Pacific Forum may refer to:

 Pacific Forum International, a Honolulu-based foreign policy research institute founded in 1975
 Pacific Islands Forum, an inter-governmental organization founded in 1971 to enhance cooperation between countries and territories of the South Pacific Ocean